was a province of Japan in the area modern Chiba Prefecture, and Ibaraki Prefecture. It lies to the north of the Bōsō Peninsula (房総半島), whose name takes its first kanji from the name of Awa Province and its second from Kazusa and Shimōsa Provinces.

Shimōsa is classified as one of the provinces of the Tōkaidō. It was bordered by Kazusa Province to the south, Musashi and Kōzuke Provinces to the west, and Hitachi and Shimotsuke Provinces to the north. Under the Engishiki classification system, Shimōsa was ranked as a "great country" (大国) and a far country (遠国).

History
Kazusa and Shimōsa) during the reign of Emperor Kōtoku (645–654). It was well-known to the Imperial Court in Nara period Japan for its fertile lands, and is mentioned in Nara period records as having supplied hemp to the Court. Shimōsa was divided into 11 (later 12) counties. The exact location of the capital of Shimōsa is not precisely known, but is believed to have been somewhere within the borders of the modern city of Ichikawa, Chiba, near  Station where the ruins of the Kokubun-ji have been located. However, the Ichinomiya of Shimōsa Province is the Katori Jingū in what is now the city of Katori, Chiba, on the opposite coast of the province.

During the Heian period, the province was divided into numerous shōen controlled by local samurai clans, primarily the Chiba clan, which sided with Minamoto no Yoritomo in the Genpei War. During the Kamakura period, much of the province was under the control of the Chiba clan. By the early Muromachi period, the area was a highly contested region highly fragmented by various samurai clans. By the Sengoku period, the Later Hōjō clan held sway following the Battle of Kōnodai (1538) against the Ashikaga clan and the Satomi clan.

Following the installation of Tokugawa Ieyasu in Edo, after the Battle of Odawara, he created eleven han within the borders of Shimōsa to reward his followers, with the remaining area retained as  tenryō territory owned directly by the shōgun and administered by various hatamoto.  The entire province had an assessed revenue of 681,062 koku.
Following the Meiji Restoration, these various domains and tenryō territories were transformed into short-lived prefectures in July 1871 by the abolition of the han system. Most of Shimōsa Province became part of the new Chiba Prefecture on June 15, 1873, with four districts (Yūki, Toyoda, Sashima, Okada) going to the new Ibaraki Prefecture and the portion to the west of the Edogawa River going to the new Saitama Prefecture.

Historical districts

The area of former Shimōsa Province was organized into twelve districts by the Meiji cadastral reforms: Chiba, Inba, Katori, Kaijō, Shimohabu. Sōsa, Okada, Sashima, Toyoda, Yūki, Sōma and Katsushika.
 Chiba Prefecture
 Chiba District (:ja:千葉郡) – dissolved
 Inba District (:ja:印旛郡) – absorbed Shimohabu District on April 1, 1897
 Katori District (:ja:香取郡)
 Kaijō District (:ja:海上郡) – dissolved
 Shimohabu District (:ja:下埴生郡) – merged into Inba District on April 1, 1897
 Sōsa District (:ja:匝瑳郡) – dissolved
 Ibaraki Prefecture
 Okada District (:ja:岡田郡) – merged into Yūki District on March 29, 1896
 Sashima District (:ja:猿島郡) – absorbed Nishikatsushika District on March 29, 1896
 Toyoda District (:ja:豊田郡 (下総国)) – merged into Yūki District on March 29, 1896
 Yūki District (:ja:結城郡) – absorbed Okada and Toyoda Districts on March 29, 1896
 Mixed
 Sōma District (:ja:相馬郡 (下総国)) – dissolved
 Kitasōma District (:ja:北相馬郡) (Ibaraki)
 Minamisōma District (:ja:南相馬郡) (Chiba) – merged into Higashikatsushika District on April 1, 1897
 Katsushika District (:ja:葛飾郡) – dissolved
 Higashikatsushika District (:ja:東葛飾郡) (Chiba) – absorbed Minamisōma District on April 1, 1897;  – now dissolved
 Nakakatsushika District (:ja:中葛飾郡) (Saitama) – merged into  Kitakatsushika District (Musashi, Saitama) on March 29, 1896
 Nishikatsushika District (:ja:西葛飾郡) (Ibaraki) – merged into Sashima District on March 29, 1896

Edo-period domains in Shimōsa Province

Notes

References
 Nussbaum, Louis-Frédéric and Käthe Roth. (2005).  Japan encyclopedia. Cambridge: Harvard University Press. ;  OCLC 58053128
 Papinot, Edmond. (1910). Historical and Geographic Dictionary of Japan. Tokyo: Librarie Sansaisha. OCLC 77691250

External links

  Murdoch's map of provinces, 1903

 
History of Chiba Prefecture
Former provinces of Japan
States and territories established in the 710s
1871 disestablishments in Japan
States and territories disestablished in 1871
718 establishments